The Nightingale is a 2018 Australian historical psychological thriller drama film written, directed, and co-produced by Jennifer Kent. Set in 1825 in the penal colony of Van Diemen's Land (present-day Tasmania), the film follows a young female convict seeking revenge for terrible acts of violence committed against her and her family. It stars Aisling Franciosi, Sam Claflin, and Baykali Ganambarr and was filmed mostly in English, with some Irish and palawa kani.

It was selected to compete for the Golden Lion at the 75th Venice International Film Festival where it won the Special Jury Prize. The film premiered at Venice on 6 September 2018 and was theatrically released in Australia on 29 August 2019, by Transmission Films.

The film received positive reviews for its performances, atmosphere, cinematography, screenplay, scope, and acknowledgement of racial violence in Australia. However, the film received controversy for its extreme and graphic depictions of violence and rape.

Plot
In 1825, on the eve of the Black War, Irish convict Clare Carroll works as a servant for a Colonial force detachment commanded by Lieutenant Hawkins. The unit is visited by an officer to see if Hawkins is fit for promotion. Clare, nicknamed "Nightingale", sings and serves drinks for the men. After work, Clare visits Hawkins to make an inquiry, and he forces her to sing a special song for him. Hawkins makes unwanted advances on her and Clare rebuffs them. She asks about the letter of recommendation that would free her, her husband Aidan, and their infant daughter Bridget, but Hawkins rapes her for her perceived insolence. Aidan suspects that Clare has been hurt but remains calm when he confronts Hawkins about the letter, but he fails to sway him.

That night, Aidan engages in a brawl with Hawkins, his second-in-command Sergeant Ruse, and Ensign Jago. The visiting officer witnesses the incident and decides that he is unfit for promotion. Hawkins commands Ruse and Jago to gather supplies for a journey through the bush to the town of Launceston, Tasmania, in hopes of negotiating with the officer. Before departing, the soldiers intercept the Carroll family, attempting to flee. Hawkins rapes Clare and bids Ruse to do so as well, which he does. Hawkins shoots and kills Aidan, and commands Jago to quiet Clare's crying baby, resulting in Jago swinging the infant against the wall and killing her. Instructed to kill Clare and "finish things," a hesitant Jago hits her in the head with his rifle butt.

The following morning, Clare awakes. She then reports the incident to a RMP officer, but realizes that he's of no help, so decides to seek revenge herself, with the help of an Aboriginal tracker named Billy. Clare presents the mission to Billy as her desire to rendezvous with her husband on his journey. At first, Clare is domineering and racist toward Billy while he sees her as being no different to the other colonists who murdered his family members, but their mutual hostility dissipates during their time together and they gradually bond as they learn about each other's tragic upbringings, with both gaining an increased appreciation for each other's culture. Billy tells Clare that his actual name is Mangana, palawa kani for “blackbird”, the yellow-tailed black cockatoo, and that he wishes to go north to reunite with the still-living female members of his people. Meanwhile, the officers recruit three white convicts and an Aboriginal man, Charlie for their journey. Hawkins takes a liking to one of the convicts, a child named Eddie, and Ruse kidnaps a woman named Lowanna to be used as a sex slave. Aboriginal men kill one of the convicts and injure Jago in an unsuccessful rescue mission. Hawkins holds Lowanna hostage, then kills her distracting the men. He, Ruse, and the convicts flee, leaving Jago behind. Later, Clare and Mangana stumble upon Jago, whom Mangana assumes is her husband. Clare corners Jago, stabbing and beating him to death (an event that haunts her later nightmares). Mangana considers abandoning Clare, but after he learns the true story behind her desire to get revenge, he decides to stay.

Charlie, as revenge for the soldiers' actions towards the natives, diverts the journey to a dead end on the summit of a mountain. Ruse kills him, but Hawkins chastises Ruse, as Charlie was the only one who could have led them out of the bush, and forces him to be their guide as humiliation on the way back down. After Clare and Mangana find Charlie's body, Mangana performs burial rites and informs Clare that now he too, seeks vengeance. The two approach the group of four men, but Clare freezes when she sees Hawkins, allowing him to graze her with a musket shot, forcing Clare and Mangana to split up. Mangana is found and forced to be the new guide. He brings the soldiers back to the main path to Launceston, and Hawkins orders Eddie to kill Mangana, but Eddie hesitates, allowing Mangana to escape. Hawkins tries to abandon Eddie, but when Eddie begs for a second chance, Hawkins shoots and kills him. Clare also finds her way back onto the main path and reunites with Mangana. They encounter a chain gang of Aboriginal men, one of whom informs Mangana that he is now the last of his people. When the prisoner yells at his captors about their treatment of indigenous people, they shoot him and the others dead before proceeding to take their heads as trophies. Later on, while eating dinner with a sympathetic couple, Mangana weeps openly, lamenting the loss of his people and home.

In Launceston, Clare confronts a newly promoted Hawkins about his war crimes in the presence of his fellow officers, while Mangana watches in hiding. The two then flee town, but Mangana dons war paint, and makes back for the town despite Clare's pleas that he will be murdered. She follows as Mangana enters the hostel where Hawkins and Ruse are lodged, and proceeds to kill them both, but not before Ruse shoots and deeply wounds him. Clare and Mangana flee and arrive at a beach where Mangana sings and dances, declaring himself a free man, while Clare sings a panegyric Gaelic folk song as the two watch the sun rise.

Cast
Aisling Franciosi as Claire  Carroll
Sam Claflin as Hawkins
Baykali Ganambarr as "Billy" Mangana
Damon Herriman as Ruse
Harry Greenwood as Jago
Ewen Leslie as Goodwin
Charlie Shotwell as Eddie
Michael Sheasby as Aidan Carroll
Charlie Jampijinpa Brown as Charlie
Magnolia Maymuru as Lowanna
Nathaniel Dean as Stoakes
 Luke Carroll as Archie

Production

According to The Sydney Morning Herald, director Jennifer Kent was "deluged" with film scripts from the United States after the success of her debut film The Babadook (2014), but decided to focus on writing and directing The Nightingale. IndieWire reported that shooting for The Nightingale began on location in Tasmania in March 2017.

Due to the brutality of the film's scenes, psychologists were brought on set to support the actors.

Release
The Nightingale was released in the United States on 2 August 2019 by IFC Films, and in Australia on 29 August by Transmission Films. The film was selected to be screened in the main competition section of the 75th Venice International Film Festival, and had its Australian premiere at the 2018 Adelaide Film Festival. IFC Films announced on Twitter they bought the rights to distribute the film in the US and have set a release for Summer 2019, following its festival run.

Reception

Critical response

Its consensus reads "The Nightingale definitely isn't for all tastes, but writer-director Jennifer Kent taps into a rich vein of palpable rage to tell a war story that leaves a bruising impact." On Metacritic, the film has a weighted average score of 77 out of 100, based on 35 critics, indicating "generally favorable reviews".

Marcella Papandrea from The Super Network said "There is no doubt The Nightingale won’t be an easy watch for most, but it is an important watch. Jennifer Kent has carefully and respectfully crafted a brutal story, spilling harsh truths along the way."

Controversy
The Nightingale received media attention following its initial screenings at the Sydney Film Festival, where approximately 30 out of 600 film-goers walked out of the cinema due to its extreme depictions of rape and murder. One viewer was heard shouting "I'm not watching this; she's already been raped twice" as she exited the cinema. Kent defended the decision to show such violence, saying that the film contains historically accurate depictions of the violence and racism which was inflicted upon the indigenous Australian people of that time. The film was produced in collaboration with Tasmanian Aboriginal elders who asserted that this is an honest and necessary depiction of their history and a story that needs to be told. Kent said she understands the negative reactions, but stated that she remains enormously proud of the film and stressed to audiences that this film is about "a need for love, compassion and kindness in dark times."

At the 2018 Venice Film festival, an Italian film critic shouted a sexist comment when Kent's name appeared in the credits. It was similar to the slurs used against the film's protagonist. The Nightingale was the only film directed by a woman to be included in the festival's main competition.

Accolades

See also
Tasmanian Gothic

References

External links
 
 

2018 films
2018 psychological thriller films
2010s chase films
2018 Western (genre) films
Australian Western (genre) films
Irish-language films
Films about Aboriginal Australians
Films scored by Jed Kurzel
Films set in 1825
Films set in colonial Australia
Films set in Tasmania
Films shot in Tasmania
IFC Films films
Rape and revenge films
Venice Special Jury Prize winners
Made Up Stories films
2010s English-language films
Australian war films